Ranger was built in London in 1796. Between 1796 and 1801 she made three complete voyages as a slave ship in the triangular trade in enslaved people. New owners in 1801 had her lengthened and sailed her as a West Indiaman. She was lost in 1802.

Career
Ranger first appeared in Lloyd's Register (LR) in 1796.

1st slave trading voyage (1796–1797): Captain Charles Anderson sailed from London on 2 October 1810, bound for the Windward Coast. Ranger acquired her slaves between Rio Nuñez and the Assini River. On her way from Africa she stopped at Prince's Island and arrived at Barabdos on 30 June 1797 with 162 slaves. She sailed from Barbados on 20 July and arrived back at London on 19 September. 

2nd slave trading voyage (1797–1799): Captain Richard Vaughn sailed from London on 8 November 1797, bound for the Gold Coast. Ranger arrived at Demerara on 15 January 1799 with 160 slaves. She arrived back at London on 3 July 1799.

3rd slave trading voyage (1799–1801): Captain Vaughn sailed from London on 28 July 1799. Ranger acquired her slaves at Cape Coast Castle. She stopped at Prince's Island before sailing on to Demerara, where she arrived on 18 August 1800 with 163 slaves. On her way back to England, Ranger stopped at Cork. Vaughn and Ranger arrived back at London on 8 February 1801.

Fate
In April 1802 Lloyd's List reported that Ranger, Lea, master, had been lost off New Providence. The Register of Shipping for 1802 carried the annotation "Lost" by her name.

Citations

1796 ships
Age of Sail merchant ships of England
London slave ships
Captured ships